Alligator mefferdi is an extinct species of alligator described by Charles Craig Mook. They lived in the Miocene period, and their range was principally in what is now Nebraska, United States. The type specimen was discovered in the Ash Hollow Formation at Ash Hollow State Historical Park.

Classification
A. mefferdi is a member of the subfamily Alligatorinae, within the larger family Alligatoridae.  Phylogenetic studies have found A. mefferdi to be most closely related to the living American alligator.

Measurements
The average measurements for the skull of A. mefferdi are 298 x 170 millimeters. Based on the length, the estimated body mass was 34.6 kg.

References

Alligatoridae
Miocene reptiles of North America
Fossil taxa described in 1946